Giroust is a French surname. Notable people with the surname include:

François Giroust (1737–1799), French composer
Jean-Antoine-Théodore Giroust (1753–1817), French painter
Marie-Suzanne Giroust (1734–1772), French painter, miniaturist, and pastelist

French-language surnames